Mirny is a rural locality (a settlement) in Dvinitskoye Rural Settlement, Syamzhensky District, Vologda Oblast, Russia. The population was 255 as of 2002. There are 5 streets.

Geography 
Mirny is located 64 km northeast of Syamzha (the district's administrative centre) by road. Averinskaya is the nearest rural locality.

References 

Rural localities in Syamzhensky District